The Cape Town Convention on International Interests in Mobile Equipment, or Cape Town Treaty is an international treaty intended to standardize transactions involving movable property. The treaty creates international standards for registration of contracts of sale (including dedicated registration agencies), security interests (liens), leases and conditional sales contracts, and various legal remedies for default in financing agreements, including repossession and the effect of particular states' bankruptcy laws.

Four protocols to the convention are specific to four types of movable equipment: Aircraft Equipment (aircraft and aircraft engines; signed in 2001), railway rolling stock (signed in 2007), space assets (signed in 2012) and "Mining, Agricultural and Construction Equipment" (signed in 2019). The aircraft Protocol entered into force in 2006, while the others are not in effect.

The treaty resulted from a diplomatic conference held in Cape Town, South Africa in 2001. The conference was attended by 68 countries and 14 international organizations. 53 countries signed the resolution proposing the treaty. The treaty came into force on 1 March 2006, and has been ratified by 57 parties. The Aircraft Protocol (which applies specifically to aircraft and aircraft engines) took effect on 1 March 2006 when it was ratified by 9 countries: Ethiopia, Ireland, Malaysia, Nigeria, Oman, Panama, Pakistan, and the United States.

Signatures and ratifications
As of 2018, the convention has been ratified by 77 states as well as the European Union. The railway rolling stock and the space protocols have been ratified by respectively three countries (Gabon, Luxembourg and Sweden), as well as the European Union, and no countries and thus have not taken effect. An overview of the status of the treaty and protocols is shown below:

European Union
The European Union joined the convention and the Aircraft Protocol as a Regional Economic Integration Organization. On the subject of the convention, both the Member states of the European Union and the Union itself have competence: e.g. while the substantive law regarding insolvency is regulated by the states, the conflict of law-rules (which county has jurisdiction etc.) is regulated by the European Union. According to the Government of the Netherlands the acceptance of the European Union in a member state which itself is not a party to the convention has no practical consequences. The European Union ratified the Luxembourg Rail protocol in December 2014 as a Regional Economic Integration Organization on the same basis.

Protocols

Aircraft Protocol
The aircraft Protocol (officially: Protocol to the Convention on International Interests in Mobile Equipment on matters specific to aircraft equipment) was signed immediately with the treaty and the only protocol currently entered into force. The International Registry of Mobile Assets established to record international property interests in the aircraft equipment covered by the treaty is located in Ireland. Mediation cases for leasing disputes are to be heard in the High Court of Ireland. As of 2022, the protocol has 81 contracting parties, which includes 80 states and the European Union.

Railway Rolling Stock

The Railway Rolling Stock Protocol, or Luxembourg Rail Protocol, officially the Protocol to the Convention on International Interests in Mobile Equipment on Matters Specific to Railway Rolling Stock was adopted on 23 February 2007 at a diplomatic conference in Luxembourg and applies to railway rolling stock (broadly defined as "vehicles movable on a fixed railway track or directly on, above or below a guideway").

The protocol establishes an international registry located in Luxembourg at which all international interests under the protocol will be registrable. The registry will also issue unique identifiers for rolling stock on request. Regulis S.A., a subsidiary of SITA, was appointed in November 2014 to act as Registrar. The protocol requires ratification by 4 countries, together with a certification by the secretariat to the Supervisory Authority that the registry is fully operational, in order to enter into force. Currently, it has been signed by France, Gabon, Germany, Italy, Luxembourg, Mozambique, Switzerland, Sweden, the UK as well as the European Union, while it has been ratified by the European Union and 3 states: Gabon, Luxembourg and Sweden.

Space Assets
The Space Assets protocol, or Berlin Space Protocol (officially Protocol to the Convention on International Interests in Mobile Equipment on Matters specific to Space Assets) was concluded on 9 March 2012 and requires 10 ratifications before entry into force. The protocol applies to objects functioning in space like satellites or satellite parts. The convention was strongly opposed by the satellite industry, claiming that it would lead to increased bureaucracy and "make the financing of new satellite projects more difficult and expensive". The convention has been signed by 5 countries (Burkina Faso, Germany, Saudi Arabia, United States and Zimbabwe), but no country has ratified it.

Mining, Agricultural, and Construction (MAC) Equipment 
On 22 November 2019, a fourth protocol to the convention was adopted to extend the convention's framework to mining, agricultural, and construction (MAC) equipment, named Protocol to the Convention on International Interests in Mobile Equipment on Matters specific to mining, agricultural, and construction equipment. The protocol was signed by 4 states (Congo, Gambia, Nigeria and Paraguay) upon its adoption and requires 5 ratifications before entry into force (provided the registry is operational then). On 1 October 2020, the United States of America signed the MAC Protocol and in 2022 the European Union bringing the total number of signatories to 6

References

External links 

Treaty text and ratifications
Aircraft protocol text and ratifications
Railway rolling stock protocol text and ratifications
Space Assets protocol text, signatures
Aircraft Protocol
International Registry of Mobile Assets
Charles W. Mooney Jr., "Contract Practices under the Cape Town Convention," The Legal Advisory Panel of the Aviation Working Group, Cape Town Papers Series, Volume I, 9 Uniform Law Review Issue 3, August 2004, Pages 703–04, .
Charles W. Mooney Jr., Marek Dubovec, William Brydie-Watson, "The mining, agricultural and construction equipment protocol to the Cape Town Convention project: The current status," 21 Uniform Law Review 2–3, August 2016, Pages 332–60

Luxembourg Rail Protocol
Rail Working Group 

Aviation agreements
Rail transport treaties
Space treaties
Treaties concluded in 2001
Treaties entered into force in 2006
UNIDROIT treaties
Treaties of Afghanistan
Treaties of Albania
Treaties of Angola
Treaties of Argentina
Treaties of Australia
Treaties of Bahrain
Treaties of Bangladesh
Treaties of Belarus
Treaties of Bhutan
Treaties of Brazil
Treaties of Burkina Faso
Treaties of Cameroon
Treaties of Canada
Treaties of Cape Verde
Treaties of the People's Republic of China
Treaties of Colombia
Treaties of the Republic of the Congo
Treaties of the Democratic Republic of the Congo
Treaties of Costa Rica
Treaties of Cuba
Treaties of Egypt
Treaties of the Transitional Government of Ethiopia
Treaties entered into by the European Union
Treaties of Fiji
Treaties of Gabon
Treaties of Ghana
Treaties of Iceland
Treaties of India
Treaties of Indonesia
Treaties of Ireland
Treaties of Ivory Coast
Treaties of Jordan
Treaties of Kazakhstan
Treaties of Kenya
Treaties of Kuwait
Treaties of Kyrgyzstan
Treaties of Latvia
Treaties of Luxembourg
Treaties of Madagascar
Treaties of Malawi
Treaties of Malaysia
Treaties of Malta
Treaties of Mexico
Treaties of Moldova
Treaties of Mongolia
Treaties of Mozambique
Treaties of Myanmar
Treaties of Namibia
Treaties of New Zealand
Treaties of Nigeria
Treaties of Norway
Treaties of Oman
Treaties of Pakistan
Treaties of Panama
Treaties of Paraguay
Treaties of Qatar
Treaties of Romania
Treaties of Russia
Treaties of Rwanda
Treaties of San Marino
Treaties of Saudi Arabia
Treaties of Senegal
Treaties of Sierra Leone
Treaties of Singapore
Treaties of South Africa
Treaties of Spain
Treaties of Sweden
Treaties of Eswatini
Treaties of Tajikistan
Treaties of Togo
Treaties of Turkey
Treaties of Ukraine
Treaties of the United Arab Emirates
Treaties of Uzbekistan
Treaties of Tanzania
Treaties of the United Kingdom
Treaties of the United States
Treaties of Vietnam
Treaties of Zambia
Treaties extended to the Netherlands Antilles
Treaties extended to Aruba
Treaties extended to Gibraltar
Treaties extended to the Cayman Islands
Treaties extended to Guernsey
Treaties extended to Bermuda
Treaties extended to the Isle of Man
2001 in South Africa
November 2001 events in South Africa